R v Badger, [1996] 1 S.C.R. 771 is a leading Supreme Court of Canada decision on the scope of aboriginal treaty rights. The Court set out a number of principles regarding the interpretation of treaties between the Crown and aboriginal peoples in Canada.

Background
Wayne Badger, Leroy Kiyawasew, and  Ernest Ominayak were Cree and status Indians under the Treaty No. 8. They were each caught hunting for food on private land. Badger was caught near a farm house, Kiyawasew was caught in a farmer's field, while Ominayak was caught in a field of Muskeg. They were charged under the Wildlife Act. At trial the three accused argued that they were entitled to hunt as part of their aboriginal treaty rights. The Crown argued that the Natural Resources Transfer Agreement of 1930 had extinguished the rights granted by Treaty No. 8. The accused were convicted and the convictions were upheld on appeal.

The issues before the Supreme Court were:
 whether status Indians under Treaty No. 8 have the right to hunt for food on privately owned land which lies within the territory surrendered under that Treaty.
 whether the hunting rights set out in Treaty No. 8 have been extinguished or modified by the Natural Resources Transfer Agreement.
 the extent, if any, that sections 26(1) (requiring a hunting licence) and 27(1) (establishing hunting seasons) of the Wildlife Act applied to the accused.

Reasons of the court
Justice Cory, writing for the majority, held that the appeals of Badger and Kiyawasew should be dismissed but Ominayak's appeal should be allowed and a new trial should be directed.

The Treaty, Cory found, granted the right to "pursue their usual vocations of hunting, trapping, and fishing", which was limited by geography and the right of the government to conserve Wildlife.

Cory gave several principles in interpreting treaties:
 a treaty represents an exchange of solemn promises between the Crown and the various Indian nations.
 the honour of the Crown is always at stake; the Crown must be assumed to intend to fulfil its promises.
 any ambiguities or doubtful expressions must be resolved in favour of the Indians and any limitations restricting the rights of Indians under treaties must be narrowly construed.
 the onus of establishing strict proof of extinguishment of a treaty or aboriginal right lies upon the Crown.

Cory then turned to the issue of the NRTA. He found that it extinguished the right to hunt commercially but not the right to hunt for food.

When interpreting any treaties, they must be given their natural meaning as understood by the Indians at the time that they were signed. The limitation of the hunting treaty should be based on visible, incompatible land use. On this basis, the appeals for Badger and Kiyawasew must be dismissed as they were hunting where it was visibly incompatible with the land use.

Cory considered whether the Wildlife Act, which required hunting licenses, violated their aboriginal right to hunt. He found that it did violate their rights and could not be justified under the Sparrow test.

See also
The Canadian Crown and First Nations, Inuit and Métis
 Canadian Aboriginal case law
Numbered Treaties
Indian Act
Section Thirty-five of the Constitution Act, 1982
Indian Health Transfer Policy (Canada)
 List of Supreme Court of Canada cases

External links
 

Supreme Court of Canada cases
Canadian Aboriginal case law
1996 in Canadian case law
1996 in the environment
Cree
Hunting in Canada